Qinghe Subdistrict is a subdistrict of northeastern Haidian District, Beijing, located just outside the 5th Ring Road near that highway's interchange with G6 Beijing–Lhasa Expressway. As of 2020, it had a population of 147,395 under its administration. People's Liberation Army Rocket Force is headquartered in Qinghe Subdistrict.

The name Qinghe came from a town that was located within the subdistrict.

History

Administrative Divisions 
As of 2021, there were 29 communities within the subdistrict:

See also
List of township-level divisions of Beijing

References 

Haidian District
Subdistricts of Beijing